The Indus Water Treaty (IWT) is a water-distribution treaty between India and Pakistan, arranged and negotiated by the World Bank, to use the water available in the Indus River and its tributaries. It was signed in Karachi on 19 September 1960 by then Indian Prime Minister Jawaharlal Nehru and then Pakistani president Ayub Khan.

The Treaty gives control over the waters of the three "eastern rivers" — the Beas, Ravi and Sutlej with a mean annual flow of  — to India, while control over the waters of the three "western rivers" — the Indus, Chenab and Jhelum with a mean annual flow of  — to Pakistan. India has about 20% of the total water carried by the Indus system while Pakistan has 80%. The treaty allows India to use the western river waters for limited irrigation use and unlimited non-consumptive use for such applications as power generation, navigation, floating of property, fish culture, etc. It lays down detailed regulations for India in building projects over the western rivers. The preamble of the treaty recognises the rights and obligations of each country in the optimum use of water from the Indus system in a spirit of goodwill, friendship and cooperation. This has not reduced the Pakistani fears that India could potentially create floods or droughts in Pakistan, especially in times of war.

In 1948, the water rights of the river system were the focus of an Indo-Pakistani water dispute. Since the ratification of the treaty in 1960, India and Pakistan have not engaged in any water wars, despite engaging in several military conflicts. Most disagreements and disputes have been settled via legal procedures, provided for within the framework of the treaty.

The Indus Waters Treaty is considered one of the most successful water sharing endeavours in the world today, even though analysts acknowledge the need to update certain technical specifications and expand the scope of the agreement to address climate change.

Treaty provisions
The Indus system of rivers comprises three western rivers — the Indus, the Jhelum and Chenab — and three eastern rivers — the Sutlej, the Beas and the Ravi. Per Article I of IWT, any river/ tributary and its catchment area of the Indus system of rivers that are not part of the other five rivers, is part of the Indus River including its creeks, delta channels, connecting lakes, etc. According to this treaty, the eastern rivers are allocated for exclusive water use by India after the permitted water uses in Pakistan before they cross finally into Pakistan. Similarly, Pakistan has an exclusive water use of the western rivers after the permitted water uses in India. Article IV (14) of IWT states that any water use developed out of the underutilized waters of another country, will not acquire water use rights due to a lapse of time. Mostly, the treaty resulted in the partitioning of the rivers rather than sharing of their waters.

A transition period of 10 years was permitted in which India was bound to supply water to Pakistan from its eastern rivers until Pakistan was able to build the canal system for utilization of waters of the western rivers. Per Article 5.1 of IWT, India agreed to make a fixed contribution of UK Pound Sterling 62,060,000/= (Pound Sterling sixty-two million and sixty thousand only or 125 metric tons of gold when gold standard was followed) towards the cost of construction of new head-works and canal system for irrigation from western rivers in Punjab province of Pakistan. India had paid the total amount in ten equal annual installments despite the 1965 Indo-Pak war. Both countries agreed in the treaty to exchange data and co-operate in the optimum use of water from the Indus system of rivers. For this purpose, the treaty creates the Permanent Indus Commission, with a commissioner appointed by each country. It would follow the set procedure for adjudicating any future differences and disputes arising over the implementation or interpretation of the treaty. The commission has survived three wars and provides an ongoing mechanism for consultation and conflict resolution through inspection, exchange of data and visits. The commission is required to meet at least once in a year to discuss potential disputes as well as cooperative arrangements for the development of the Indus system of rivers. Per article VIII (8), both commissioners together shall submit an annual report to both countries on its works. But these annual reports are never made public even by Pakistan which claims repeated violations of the treaty by India.

Either party must notify the other of plans to construct any engineering works which would affect the other party and to provide data about such works. The annual inspections and exchange of data continue, unperturbed by tensions on the subcontinent. Salal dam was constructed after entering mutual agreement by both countries. Tulbul Project is pending for clearance for decades even after protracted discussions between India and Pakistan. In cases of dispute or disagreement, Permanent Court of Arbitration (PCA) or a neutral technical expert respectively is called in for arbitration. Technical expert's ruling was followed for clearing the Baglihar power plant and PCA verdict was followed for clearing the Kishanganga Hydroelectric Plant. Pakistan is claiming violation of the treaty regarding 850 MW Ratle Hydroelectric Plant and asked for the establishment of a Court of Arbitration (PCA) whereas India asked for the appointment of a Neutral Expert. India has not yet raised any violation of Article II of IWT by Pakistan though Pakistan is using groundwater for various uses in the basin area of Ravi and Sutlej before these rivers finally cross in to Pakistan. Pakistan also constructed river training works in such a manner to reduce river flooding in its area and enhance flooding in Great Rann of Kutch area of India violating Article IV(3a). Pakistan raising disputes and approaching the PCA against Indian projects, could result in the abolition of the IWT when its provisions are interpreted in detail by the PCA verdicts.

History and background

The waters of the Indus system of rivers begin mainly in Tibet and the Himalayan mountains in the states of Himachal Pradesh and Jammu and Kashmir. They flow through the states of Punjab and Sindh before emptying into the Arabian Sea south of Karachi and Kori Creek in Gujarat.

The partition of British India created a conflict over the waters of the Indus basin. The newly formed states were at odds over how to share and manage what was essentially a cohesive and unitary network of irrigation. Furthermore, the geography of partition was such that the source rivers of the Indus basin were in India. Pakistan felt its livelihood threatened by the prospect of Indian control over the tributaries that fed water into the Pakistani portion of the basin. Where India certainly had its own ambitions for the profitable development of the basin, Pakistan felt acutely threatened by a conflict over the main source of water for its cultivable land. During the first years of partition, the waters of the Indus were apportioned by the Inter-Dominion Accord of May 4, 1948. This accord required India to release sufficient water through existing canals to the Pakistani regions of the basin in return for annual payments from the government of Pakistan. The accord was meant to meet immediate requirements and was followed by negotiations for a more permanent solution. However, neither side was willing to compromise their respective positions and negotiations reached a stalemate. From the Indian point of view, there was nothing that Pakistan could do to force India to divert, from any of its schemes, the river water into the irrigation canals of Pakistan. Pakistan wanted to take the matter at that time to the International Court of Justice, but India refused, arguing that the conflict required a bilateral resolution.

World Bank involvement

In 1951, David Lilienthal, formerly the chairman of the Tennessee Valley Authority and of the U.S. Atomic Energy Commission, visited the region to write a series of articles for Collier's magazine. Lilienthal had a keen interest in the subcontinent and was welcomed by the highest levels of both Indian and Pakistani governments. Although his visit was sponsored by Collier's, Lilienthal was briefed by the state department and executive branch officials, who hoped that Lilienthal could help bridge the gap between India and Pakistan and also gauge hostilities on the subcontinent. During the course of his visit, it became clear to Lilienthal that tensions between India and Pakistan were acute, but also unable to be erased with one sweeping gesture. He wrote in his journal:India and Pakistan were on the verge of war over Kashmir. There seemed to be no possibility of negotiating this issue until tensions abated. One way to reduce hostility . . . would be to concentrate on other important issues where cooperation was possible. Progress in these areas would promote a sense of community between the two nations which might, in time, lead to a Kashmir settlement. Accordingly, I proposed that India and Pakistan work out a program jointly to develop and jointly operate the Indus Basin River system, upon which both nations were dependent for irrigation water. With new dams and irrigation canals, the Indus and its tributaries could be made to yield the additional water each country needed for increased food production. In the article, I suggested that the World Bank might use its good offices to bring the parties to an agreement and help in the financing of an Indus Development program. Lilienthal's idea was well received by officials at the World Bank (then the International Bank for Reconstruction and Development) and subsequently, by the Indian and Pakistani governments. Eugene R. Black, then president of the World Bank, told Lilienthal that his proposal "makes good sense all round". Black wrote that the Bank was interested in the economic progress of the two countries and had been concerned that the Indus dispute could only be a serious handicap to this development. India's previous objections to third party arbitration were remedied by the Bank's insistence that it would not adjudicate the conflict but rather work as a conduit for agreement.

Black also made a distinction between the "functional" and "political" aspects of the Indus dispute. In his correspondence with Indian and Pakistan leaders, Black asserted that the Indus dispute could most realistically be solved if the functional aspects of disagreement were negotiated apart from political considerations. He envisioned a group that tackled the question of how best to utilize the waters of the Indus Basin, leaving aside questions of historic rights or allocations.

Black proposed a Working Party made up of Indian, Pakistani and World Bank engineers. The World Bank delegation would act as a consultative group, charged with offering suggestions and speeding dialogue. In his opening statement to the Working Party, Black spoke of why he was optimistic about the group's success:One aspect of Mr. Lilienthal's proposal appealed to me from the first. I mean his insistence that the Indus problem is an engineering problem and should be dealt with by engineers. One of the strengths of the engineering profession is that, all over the world, engineers speak the same language and approach problems with common standards of judgment.Black's hopes for a quick resolution to the Indus dispute were premature. While the Bank had expected that the two sides would come to an agreement on the allocation of waters, neither India nor Pakistan seemed willing to compromise their positions. While Pakistan insisted on its historical right to waters of all the Indus tributaries and that half of West Punjab was under threat of desertification, the Indian side argued that the previous distribution of waters should not set future allocation. Instead, the Indian side set up a new basis of distribution, with the waters of the Western tributaries going to Pakistan and the Eastern tributaries to India. The substantive technical discussions that Black had hoped for were stymied by the political considerations he had expected to avoid.

The World Bank soon became frustrated with this lack of progress. What had originally been envisioned as a technical dispute that would quickly untangle itself started to seem intractable. India and Pakistan were unable to agree on the technical aspects of allocation, let alone the implementation of any agreed-upon distribution of waters. Finally, in 1954, after nearly two years of negotiation, the World Bank offered its own proposal, stepping beyond the limited role it had apportioned for itself and forcing the two sides to consider concrete plans for the future of the basin. The proposal offered India the three eastern tributaries of the basin and Pakistan the three western tributaries. Canals and storage dams were to be constructed to divert waters from the western rivers and replace the eastern river supply lost by Pakistan.

While the Indian side was amenable to the World Bank proposal, Pakistan found it unacceptable. The World Bank allocated the eastern rivers to India and the western rivers to Pakistan. This new distribution did not account for the historical usage of the Indus basin or the fact that West Punjab's Eastern districts could turn into deserts, and repudiated Pakistan's negotiating position. Where India had stood for a new system of allocation, Pakistan felt that its share of waters should be based on pre-partition distribution. The World Bank proposal was more in line with the Indian plan, and this angered the Pakistani delegation. They threatened to withdraw from the Working Party, and negotiations verged on collapse.

However, neither side could afford the dissolution of talks. The Pakistani press met rumors of an end to negotiation with talk of increased hostilities; the government was ill-prepared to forego talks for a violent conflict with India and was forced to reconsider its position. India was also eager to settle the Indus issue; large development projects were put on hold by negotiations, and Indian leaders were eager to divert water for irrigation. In December 1954, the two sides returned to the negotiating table. The World Bank proposal was transformed from a basis of settlement to a basis for negotiation and the talks continued, stop and go, for the next six years.

One of the last stumbling blocks to an agreement concerning financing for the construction of canals and storage facilities that would transfer water from the western rivers to Pakistan. This transfer was necessary to make up for the water Pakistan was giving up by ceding its rights to the eastern rivers. The World Bank initially planned for India to pay for these works, but India refused. The Bank responded with a plan for external financing.  An Indus Basin Development Fund Agreement (Karachi, 19 September 1960); a treaty between Australia, Canada, West Germany, New Zealand, the United Kingdom, the United States with the International Bank for Reconstruction and Development (IRDC) and Pakistan who agreed to provide Pakistan a combination of funds and loans. This solution cleared the remaining stumbling blocks to the agreement and the IWT was signed by both countries on the same day in 1960 applicable with retrospective effect from 1 April 1960 but "Indus Basin Development Fund Agreement" provisions do not affect the IWT in any way per its Article XI(3).  The grants and loans to Pakistan were extended in 1964 through a supplementary agreement.

Grants and Loans to Pakistan

Presently, the World Bank role in the treaty is limited to keep the dispute settlement process moving when a party/country is not cooperating to follow the arbitration procedure given in the treaty in case of a dispute.

Treaty implications 
These water allocations made to the Jammu and Kashmir state of India are meager to meet its irrigation water requirements whereas the treaty permitted enough water to irrigate 80.52% of the cultivated lands in the Indus river basin of Pakistan. The storage capacity permitted by the treaty for hydropower generation is less than the total annual silt that would accumulate in the reservoirs if the total hydro potential of the state was to be exploited fully. Pakistan is also losing additional benefits by not permitting moderate water storage in upstream J&K state whose water would be ultimately released to Pakistan for its use and avoid few dams requirement in its territory. Ultimately, J&K state is bound to resort to costly de-silting of its reservoirs to keep them operational. Whereas Pakistan is planning to build multi-purpose water reservoirs with massive storage for impounding multi-year inflows such as 4,500 MW Diamer-Bhasha Dam, 3,600 MW Kalabagh Dam, 600 MW Akhori Dam, Dasu Dam, Bunji Dam, Thakot dam, Patan dam, etc. projects with huge population resettlement. In case of any dam break, downstream areas in Pakistan as well as Kutch region in India would face unprecedented water deluge or submergence as these dams are located in highly active seismic zones.

However, India derives military advantage out of IWT as its scope is confined to the Indus system of rivers (both eastern and western rivers) basin area located in India and also in Ravi and Sutlej basins located in Pakistan per Articles II(1 to 4) and III(2 to 3) and the IWT deals only with the sharing of water available/flowing in Indian part between Pakistan and India. As per the IWT, Pakistan bombing / destroying dams, barrages, power stations, etc. located in Indian part of the Indus system of rivers is violation of the IWT which can lead to abrogation of IWT.

Treaty under scrutiny

Pakistani concerns 
Pakistan raised concerns with World Bank regarding India's new dam project on the Chenab River, saying that it is not in conformity with the Indus Water Treaty (IWT) and argued that India could use these reservoirs to create artificial water shortage or flooding in Pakistan.

In 2019, in the aftermath of the Pulwama attack, the Union Minister for Water Resources and a senior leader in the ruling party BJP Nitin Gadkari said that all water flowing from India will be diverted to Indian states to punish Pakistan for an alleged connection to the attack, something which the Pakistani Government denied and condemned. Union Minister of State for Jal Shakti Rattan Lal Kataria said that "every effort is made" to stop the flow of water downstream from the three assigned rivers.

Kutch 

The Indus River water also flows into the Kori Creek, located in Rann of Kutch area of Gujarat state in India, through its delta channel called Nara River via Shakoor Lake before joining the sea. Without the consent of India, from 1987 to 1997 Pakistan constructed the Left Bank Outfall Drain (LBOD) project passing through the Great Rann of Kutch area with assistance from the world bank. In violation of IWT Article IV(10), the LBOD's purpose is to bypass the saline and polluted water flowing into the Indus delta of Pakistan and diverted to reach the sea via the Rann of Kutch area. Water released by the LBOD enhances the flooding in India and contaminates the quality of water bodies which are a source of water to salt farms spread over a vast area. The LBOD water is passing to the sea via the disputed Sir Creek which is held by India up to its centre line but claimed by Pakistan totally, and LBOD water also enters into Indian territory due to many breaches in its left bank caused by floods. Since Gujarat state of India being the lower most riparian part of the Indus basin, Pakistan is bound to provide all the details of engineering works taken up by Pakistan to India to ensure no material damage is caused to India as per the provisions of Article IV of the treaty and shall not proceed with the project works till the disagreements are settled by arbitration process.

2016 Uri Attack 
In the aftermath of the 2016 Uri attack, India threatened to revoke the Indus Waters Treaty. The Prime Minister Narendra Modi declared, "blood and water cannot flow together." So far, such threats have not materialised. However, India decided to restart the Tulbul Project on the Jhelum River in the Kashmir Valley, which was previously suspended in response to Pakistan's objections. Political analyst Hasan Askari Rizvi in Lahore said that any change to the water supply of Pakistan would have a "devastating impact". India stated in February 2020 that it wants to follow the IWT in letter and spirit.

Complete utilization efforts by India 
Excluding the flood water released into the downstream Ravi River from the Madhopur headworks, additionally  water in an average year is available between Madhopur headworks and the final crossing point (Ravi siphon) into Pakistan which is not yet put to use by India and flowing additionally into Pakistan. Also flood water flows into Pakistan from Hussainiwala headworks which is the terminal barrage across the Sutlej River in India. In addition, India is entitled to use western river's waters for limited agricultural uses and unlimited domestic, non-consumptive, hydropower generation, etc. uses. India is undertaking three projects to utilize its full share of the eastern rivers, (a) Shahpurkandi dam project on the Ravi River (b) the second Ravi-Beas link in Punjab and (c) the Ujh Dam project on Ujh River in Jammu and Kashmir. This water will be used by Punjab along with northern hill states.

Renegotiation demands

In 2003, J&K state assembly passed a unanimous resolution for the abrogation of the treaty, and again in June 2016, the Jammu and Kashmir assembly demanded revision of the Indus Water Treaty. The legislators feel that the treaty trampled upon the rights of the people and treats the state of Jammu and Kashmir as a non-entity.

In 2023, India officially notified Pakistan to renegotiate the treaty, alleging that it was repeatedly indulging in actions that are against the spirit and objective of the treaty.

India has not appointed the two judges of the PCA jury from its side as it had considered simultaneous proceedings of PCA and NE as a violation of IWT agreement.

See also

 India–Pakistan relations
 Indian Rivers Inter-link
 Indo-Pakistani water dispute of 1948
 Irrigation in India 
 Rivers of Jammu and Kashmir
 Sapta Sindhu Rigvedic rivers of Punjab
 Madhopur Headworks
 Water conflict
 Water politics
 Little Rann of Kutch
 Baglihar Dam
 Wular Lake
 Kishanganga Hydroelectric Plant
 Gulpur Hydropower Project
 Sutlej Yamuna link canal
 Inland waterways of India

 Indus River System Authority

Sources
 Barrett, Scott: Conflict and Cooperation in Managing International Water Resources, Policy Research Working Paper 1303, The World Bank, May 1994.
 Michel, Aloys Arthur: The Indus Rivers – A Study of the Effects of Partition, Yale University Press: New Haven, 1967.
 Verghese, B.G.: Waters of Hope, Oxford and IBH Publishing: New Delhi, 1990.
 Indus Waters Treaty: an exercise in international mediation by Niranjan Das Gulhati

References

Further reading
 Ali, Saleem H. "Water Politics in South Asia: Technocratic Cooperation in the Indus basin and beyond", Journal of International Affairs, Spring, 2008.
 
Qamar, M.U., Azmat, M. & Claps, P. Pitfalls in transboundary Indus Water Treaty: a perspective to prevent unattended threats to the global security. npj Clean Water 2, 22 (2019) doi:10.1038/s41545-019-0046-x

External links 
 
 Bibliography Water Resources and International Law  See Indus River. Peace Palace Library
 The Indus Waters Treaty: A History .  Henry L. Stimson Center.
 The Politics of Indo-Pak Water-Sharing. Young Bhartiya.

Indian documents
India–Pakistan relations
1960 in India
1960 in Pakistan
Treaties concluded in 1960
Indus basin
Treaties of Pakistan
India–Pakistan treaties
Water conflicts
Water treaties
September 1960 events in Asia